Vavilov (feminine: Vavilova) is a Russian surname. Notable people with the surname include:

 Andrey Petrovich Vavilov (b. 1961), Russian politician and businessman
 Elena Vavilova (born 1962), also known as Tracey Foley, Russian KGB sleeper agent
 Natalya Vavilova (born 1959), Russian actress
 Nikolai Vavilov (1887–1943), Russian geneticist
 Sergey Ivanovich Vavilov (1891–1951), Russian physicist
 Vladimir Sergeyevich Vavilov (born 1988), Russian footballer
 Vladimir Fyodorovich Vavilov (1925–1973), Russian guitarist and composer

See also
 "Vavilov" (Cosmos: Possible Worlds), an episode of Cosmos: Possible Worlds
 Vavilov (crater)
 Canada (Minister of Citizenship and Immigration) v Vavilov, a 2019 Supreme Court of Canada case

Russian-language surnames